James McHugh may refer to:
 James McHugh (Gaelic footballer), Irish former Gaelic footballer
 James T. McHugh (1932–2000), American Roman Catholic bishop
 James M. McHugh (1899–1966), American World War II intelligence officer
 Jimmy McHugh (James Francis McHugh, 1894–1969), American composer

https://en.wikipedia.org/wiki/Frederick_the_Great